Zhala Bobhata (झाला बोभाटा) is a 2017 Marathi comedy movie starring veteran actor Dilip Prabhavalkar, Kamlesh Sawant, Sanjay Khapre, Bhalchandra Kadam. The film is written and directed by Anup Ashok Jagdale and its screenplay and dialogues are written by Chala Hawa Yeu Dya  writer Arvind Jagtap. It had its theatrical release on 6 January 2017.

Plot
The villagers try to heal an ill man so he can reveal the name of a cheating wife.

Cast   
 Dilip Prabhavalkar
 Kamlesh Sawant
 Sanjay Khapre
 Bhalchandra Kadam
 Reena Aggarwal 
 Mayuresh Pem
 Monalisa Bagal
 Balkrishna Shinde

References

External links 
 

2017 films
Indian drama films
2010s Marathi-language films
2017 drama films